Festim Alidema (born 5 October 1997) is a Kosovan professional footballer who plays as a right winger for Kosovo Superleague club Llapi.

Club career

Llapi
On 9 January 2018, Alidema joined Football Superleague of Kosovo side Llapi after agreeing to a one-and-a-half-year deal. On 18 February 2018, he made his debut in a 2–0 away defeat against Prishtina after coming on as a substitute at 46th minute in place of Gentrit Begolli.

Slaven Belupo
On 17 July 2019, Alidema joined Croatian First Football League side Slaven Belupo after agreeing to a two-year deal with the option of continuation for another two years. On 24 August 2019, he made his debut in a 1–1 home draw against Varaždin after coming on as a substitute at 84th minute in place of Bruno Bogojević.

Loan at Hrvatski Dragovoljac
On 7 February 2020, Alidema was loaned to Croatian Second Football League club Hrvatski Dragovoljac. Eight days later is confirmed that he had joined on a four-month-long loan and received squad number 9.

Loan at Drita
On 26 August 2020, Alidema joined Football Superleague of Kosovo side Drita, on a season-long loan.

International career
On 3 June 2019, Alidema received a call-up from Kosovo for second training session before the UEFA Euro 2020 qualifying matches against Montenegro and Bulgaria, but did not become part of the final team.

Career statistics

Club

References

External links

1997 births
Living people
People from Gjilan
Kosovan footballers
Kosovan expatriate footballers
Expatriate footballers in Croatia
Kosovan expatriate sportspeople in Croatia
Association football wingers
KF Llapi players
FC Drita players
NK Slaven Belupo players
NK Hrvatski Dragovoljac players
Football Superleague of Kosovo players
Croatian Football League players
First Football League (Croatia) players